Filip Erić (born 10 October 1994) is a Serbian professional football goalkeeper.

With Zvijezda 09, he won the First League of RS in the 2017–18 season and got promoted to the Bosnian Premier League. He left the club after his contract expired on 29 May 2019.

On 13 June 2019, Erić signed a two year contract with Željezničar. He left Željezničar in May 2021.

Honours
Zvijezda 09
First League of RS: 2017–18

References

External links
 Filip Erić at Sofascore
Filip Erić at nfsbih.ba

1994 births
Living people
Sportspeople from Loznica
Serbian footballers
Serbian SuperLiga players
First League of the Republika Srpska players
Premier League of Bosnia and Herzegovina players
FK Voždovac players
FK Drina Zvornik players
FK Rad players
FK Sloboda Tuzla players
FK Zvijezda 09 players 
FK Željezničar Sarajevo players
Association football goalkeepers